Benjamin Nicoll Huntington (May 5, 1816 – November 10, 1882) was an American farmer, banker, and politician from New York.

Born in Rome, New York, Huntington was a son of businessman and politician Henry Huntington and Catharine M. Havens. His grandfather was congressman Benjamin Huntington, and his uncles were congressman Jonathan Nicoll Havens and assemblyman Gurdon Huntington.

Huntington was a farmer. From 1863 to 1876, he was president of the Utica bank, later known as the First National Bank of Utica.

In 1851, Huntington was elected supervisor of Rome. Later that year, he was elected to the New York State Senate as a Whig to fill a vacancy, representing New York's 19th State Senate district. He served in 1851, and was then elected to a full term and sat in the Senate in 1852 and 1853. While in the Senate, he was a member of the Court of Impeachment for the trial of Canal Commissioner John C. Mather. He was a presidential elector for the 1860 presidential election. In 1865, he was elected to the New York State Assembly as a Republican, representing the Oneida County 3rd District. He served in the Assembly in 1866. He was also a trustee of Rome for two years. He was a member of the 1867 New York State Constitutional Convention.

Huntington was president of the Oneida County Agricultural Society in 1850 and the New York State Agricultural Society in 1860. In 1855, he married Mabel Limbrieck. They had one surviving son, Henry.

Huntington died at home on November 10, 1882. He was buried in Rome Cemetery.

References

External links 

 The Political Graveyard
 

1816 births
1882 deaths
Politicians from Rome, New York
Farmers from New York (state)
American bank presidents
New York (state) Whigs
1860 United States presidential electors
New York (state) Republicans
Town supervisors in New York (state)
New York (state) state senators
Members of the New York State Assembly
Burials in New York (state)
19th-century American businesspeople